Podkoren is a settlement in the Municipality of Kranjska Gora in the northwestern Upper Carniola region of Slovenia.

Geography
It is situated in the Upper Sava Valley. The Zelenci nature reserve, at the source of the Sava River, is located just west of the village. The Sava Dolinka River flows east from here, to the south of Podkoren. Originally an agricultural area, the local economy today mainly depends on tourism, especially in winter with several ski pistes on the slopes of the Karawanks.

The village center lies on the road from Jesenice and Kranjska Gora to Rateče and the border with Italy in the west. Here the Wurzen Pass road branches off, leading across the main ridge of the Karawanks range to the Austrian state of Carinthia in the north.

History
From the 15th century Podkoren, in the far northwest of the Duchy of Carniola, was a toll station on the steep road up to the Wurzen mountain pass, for centuries the shortest and most direct link from the Littoral towns of Trieste and Gorizia to Villach in Carinthia. Today the main link is on the A2 motorway through the Karawanks Tunnel further east. A former railway line from Jesenice via Kranjska Gora and Podkoren to Tarvisio in the west built in the 1870s was dismantled after train service ceased in 1966.

The village church is dedicated to Saint Andrew and is of late Gothic origin, as are many houses in the village, but it was largely refurbished in the Baroque style.

The British chemist Humphry Davy (1778–1829) stayed here on a visit to the area.

References

External links

Podkoren on Geopedia

Populated places in the Municipality of Kranjska Gora